Elytrophorus is a genus of Asian, African, and Australian plants in the grass family.

 Species
 Elytrophorus globularis Hack. – Republic of the Congo, Tanzania, Angola, Zambia, Zimbabwe, Botswana, Limpopo, Namibia
 Elytrophorus spicatus (Willd.) A.Camus – tropical Africa, Indian Subcontinent, Indochina, Hainan, Yunnan, Lesser Sunda Islands, Australia

References

Molinieae
Grasses of Africa
Grasses of Asia
Poales of Australia
Grasses of China
Grasses of India
Grasses of Pakistan
Poaceae genera